Juliette Powell American-born Canadian model, television host, producer and author. She was the Miss Canada titleholder in 1989, the contest's first Black Canadian winner.

Early life
Powell was born in Manhattan, New York in 1971 and moved to Montreal, Quebec with her French-Canadian mother at the age of eight, following her parents' divorce. In high school she excelled in math and science courses and swam twice a week, and has stated she saw herself as a shy and unpopular student.

Her time in the world of beauty pageants began with her outrage when she heard a rumour that the second place winner of the Miss Montreal pageant had scored higher than the first-place winner, but the judges had not accepted her as the winner because she was black. She has stated that she did not want to be a beauty queen but wanted to prove a point when she entered the Miss Montreal pageant herself, later entering and ultimately winning the 1989 Miss Canada Pageant. During this time she also studied Commerce at Vanier College, graduating in 1992.

Career
After her reign as Miss Canada, including representing the country at Miss Universe 1989, Powell joined MusiquePlus in 1992 as a VJ, while also studying finance and business at McGill University. She was host of MusiquePlus' weekly dance music show, Bouge de là! until 1996. That same year, she moved to Toronto, transferring to MuchMusic and becoming host of Electric Circus and French Kiss, while also studying economics at the University of Toronto.

In 1999, Powell began working for CablePulse 24 as a business reporter and founded media and consulting company Powell International Entertainment Inc. (PIE Inc.) which produced features with personalities such as Nelson Mandela, Rubin 'Hurricane' Carter, Sir Richard Branson, Tim Burton, Steven Spielberg, Tom Cruise, Janet Jackson, Tina Turner, and Prince Charles.

In 2001, she co-authored the media section for the UN Plan of Action of the World Conference against Racism.

She is author of the 2008 book 33 Million People in the Room: How to Create, Influence and Run a Successful Business using Social Networking (Financial Times Press).

In 2011, she began working with the E-G8, an extension of the G8 Summit, created to inform G8 leaders on the future of the internet and connected society.

Powell gave a TED Talk on Unconscious Bias at TEDx St Louis Women's event titled It's About Time We Challenge Our Unconscious Biases in 2016.

As of 2018 she was a student at Columbia University's School of General Studies.

References

External links
 

Living people
American emigrants to Canada
American people of Canadian descent
Black Canadian broadcasters
Black Canadian women
Canadian television news anchors
Canadian television reporters and correspondents
Canadian women television journalists
Canadian VJs (media personalities)
Miss Canada winners
Miss Universe 1989 contestants
Much (TV channel) personalities
Television personalities from Montreal
Television personalities from New York City
McGill University Faculty of Management alumni
University of Toronto alumni
Year of birth missing (living people)